Rebecca Michelle "Mikie" Sherrill (born January 19, 1972) is an American politician, former U.S. Navy helicopter pilot, attorney, and former federal prosecutor serving as the U.S. representative for  since 2019. The district includes a swath of suburban and exurban areas west of New York City. A member of the Democratic Party, Sherrill was elected on November 6, 2018, defeating Republican Jay Webber. She was reelected in 2020 by a slightly narrower margin and reelected in 2022 by a wide margin.

Early life and education 
Sherrill was born in Alexandria, Virginia. She grew up in various locations along the East Coast of the United States due to her father's job.

Sherrill is a graduate of South Lakes High School in Reston, Virginia. In 1994, she earned her B.S. from the United States Naval Academy in Annapolis. In 2003, Sherrill received an MSc in international and world history from the London School of Economics. In 2004, she received a certificate in Arabic language from the American University in Cairo. In 2007, Sherrill earned a Juris Doctor from Georgetown University Law Center.

Military career 
Inspired by her grandfather who served as a pilot in World War II, Sherrill wanted to be a pilot from a young age. She was among the flight school graduates in the first class of women eligible for combat. After graduation from the Naval Academy in 1994, Sherrill became a U.S. Navy H-3 Sea King helicopter pilot and a Russian policy officer. Sherrill flew missions throughout Europe and in the Middle East. In 2000, she was based at Naval Air Station Corpus Christi.

Sherrill was a Russian policy officer when she worked at the Commander-in-Chief of the U.S. Navy, Europe.

Sherrill served in the United States Navy for nine years, the final five as a lieutenant. In 2003 Sherrill was nominated for promotion to the rank of Lieutenant Commander. She left the Navy in 2003 before obtaining a permanent promotion to the rank of Lieutenant Commander.

Law career 
In the summer of 2007, while earning her J.D. degree from Georgetown University Law Center, Sherrill was a summer associate at Kirkland & Ellis. After graduation from Georgetown University Law Center, Sherill returned to Kirkland & Ellis's New York City office, where she worked in the litigation department from 2008 to 2011.

Assistant U.S. Attorney 
After leaving Kirkland & Ellis, Sherrill joined the United States Attorneys' Office as an outreach and reentry coordinator. In 2015 Sherrill became an Assistant United States Attorney for the District of New Jersey, a federal prosecutor, working under U.S. Attorney Paul Fishman. She left that office in the spring of 2016. At the time, she planned on going into the field of criminal justice reform.

U.S. House of Representatives

Elections

2018 

On May 11, 2017, Sherrill launched her campaign for New Jersey's 11th congressional district in the United States House of Representatives. The seat had been held by 12-term Republican incumbent Rodney Frelinghuysen, the chairman of the House Appropriations Committee, who in January 2018 announced he would not seek reelection. The district had long been considered a Republican stronghold, even after it had been made slightly more Democratic on paper by pushing it further into Essex County, including a slice of Montclair around Sherrill's home. Frelinghuysen had been reelected three more times from this redrawn district without serious difficulty, but was thought to be vulnerable after Donald Trump carried it by just a single point in 2016.

In November 2017, comedian Chelsea Handler, who is from Livingston, went to Montclair to show her support for Sherrill's campaign. Sherrill was endorsed by the political action committee organization VoteVets.org, the pro-choice Democratic PAC EMILY's List, the editorial board of The New York Times, and the New Jersey chapter of Clean Water Action.

In June 2018, Sherrill won the Democratic primary with 77% of the vote, beating social worker and entrepreneur Tamara Harris.

Sherrill raised $2.8 million during the primary election, placing her among the top House fundraisers in the country. Her campaign raised $1.9 million in the second quarter of 2018, setting a record for a House candidate from New Jersey in one quarter.

On November 6, Sherrill defeated Republican Jay Webber with 56.8% of the vote to Webber's 42.1%. The election marked the largest partisan vote share swing in the 2018 cycle, with a 33-percentage-point swing from a 19-point Republican margin in 2016 to a 15-point Democratic one in 2018. Sherrill is the first Democrat to win this seat since 16-term incumbent Joseph Minish was defeated in 1984 after the district had been redrawn to be more Republican. She was the first Democrat since Minish's defeat to win more than 40% of the district's vote. Sherrill is the only elected Democrat above the county level in much of the district's western portion—Frelinghuysen's former base. For example, in the district's share of Morris County, which accounts for most of its population, all but one state senator and two state assemblymen are Republicans.

2020 

Sherrill had a closer contest for reelection in 2020, defeating Republican Rosemary Becchi with 53 percent of the vote. She was likely helped by Joe Biden carrying the district with 53% of the vote, the first Democratic presidential candidate to do so since the district assumed its present configuration in 1984.

2022 

With redistricting following the 2020 census, the 11th District became more favorable for Sherrill, as its portions of Republican-heavy Sussex County were dropped in favor of more Democratic areas of Essex County. Sherrill won by a much wider margin, defeating Republican Paul DeGroot.

Tenure 
Following her election, Sherrill joined the moderate New Democrat Coalition, the second-largest Democratic caucus in the House, and was named its freshman whip. She also joined the Blue Dog Coalition, a caucus of moderate and conservative House Democrats. She joined two other female veterans in the Democratic freshman class, fellow Naval Academy graduate Elaine Luria and former Air Force officer Chrissy Houlahan.

Per a promise to her constituents, Sherrill did not vote for Nancy Pelosi to retake the speakership, instead voting for Cheri Bustos of Illinois. She voted "present", essentially an abstention, in her second Speakership vote.

In 2019, Sherrill initially opposed exploring the first impeachment of President Donald Trump, but she changed her mind in September after a whistleblower alleged that Trump pressured Ukrainian President Volodymyr Zelensky to investigate Joe Biden. According to one report, Sherrill was instrumental in motivating House speaker Nancy Pelosi to proceed with the impeachment inquiry and said her "grave concerns" about Trump's behavior were "rooted in self-sacrifice and principle". An op-ed she co-wrote with six other freshman Democrats with national security backgrounds—Houlahan, Luria, Gil Cisneros, Jason Crow, Elissa Slotkin and Abigail Spanberger—said that "everything we do harks back to our oaths to defend the country" and described the claims against Trump as "a threat to all we have sworn to protect".

Sherrill indicated her support for a second impeachment of Trump after the 2021 United States Capitol attack. She said she had seen some colleagues giving what she called "reconnaissance tours" of the building the day before the attack.

As of November 2021, Sherrill had voted in line with Joe Biden's stated position 100% of the time.

On February 1, 2023, Sherrill was among twelve Democrats to vote for a resolution to end COVID-19 national emergency.

Committee assignments, 117th Congress 
 Committee on Armed Services
 Subcommittee on Tactical Air and Land Forces (Vice Chair)
Subcommittee on Intelligence and Special Operations
 Committee on Science, Space, and Technology
Subcommittee on Environment (Chair)
United States House Committee on Education and Labor
Subcommittee on Higher Education and Workforce Investment

Caucus memberships 
 Blue Dog Coalition
 Congressional Caucus for Women's Issues
 New Democrat Coalition
Global Positioning System Caucus
Congressional Animal Protection Caucus
For Country Caucus

Electoral history

Personal life 
Sherrill is married to Jason Hedberg, a fellow classmate and graduate of the United States Naval Academy, who served as a U.S. Navy intelligence officer. The couple has lived in Montclair with their four children since 2010.

Sherrill is Roman Catholic.

See also 
 Women in the United States House of Representatives

References

External links 

 Congresswoman Mikie Sherrill official U.S. House website
Mikie Sherrill for Congress

|-

1972 births
Living people
20th-century American women politicians
Democratic Party members of the United States House of Representatives from New Jersey
20th-century American politicians
21st-century American women politicians
21st-century American politicians
American women aviators
American Roman Catholics
Catholics from New Jersey
Female members of the United States House of Representatives
Georgetown University Law Center alumni
Helicopter pilots
People associated with Kirkland & Ellis
People from Alexandria, Virginia
People from Montclair, New Jersey
United States Naval Academy alumni
United States Naval Flight Officers
United States Navy officers
Military personnel from New Jersey